English rock band Happy Mondays have released five studio albums and three live albums.

Studio albums

Live albums

Compilation albums

Extended plays

Singles

References

Discographies of British artists
Rock music group discographies
Pop music group discographies